Bob Seeley (born September 13, 1928, Detroit, Michigan) is an American boogie woogie pianist.

Biography
Seeley has played piano at Charlie's Crab in Troy, Michigan, a northern suburb of Detroit, for over three decades. He has played Carnegie Hall several times, and major venues throughout Europe.  He has released five albums and is working on a sixth with Bob Baldori.

His greatest influence was Meade Lux Lewis. Seeley first met Lewis during a Detroit gig in the late 1940s, and a longstanding friendship through  the 1950s and 1960s developed, which influenced Seeley's piano styling. Seeley also played piano with Art Tatum. Eubie Blake was also among Seeley's circle of friends.

Seeley worked for a while as accompanist to Sippie Wallace. Seeley is an all-around pianist whose interest and repertoire span ragtime, stride, blues and boogie woogie.

Seeley also has participated in the so-called "Cheek to Cheek Boogie" with Mark Braun AKA Mr. B. Seeley performed annually at The Bloomington Blues & Boogie Woogie Piano Festival, in Bloomington, Indiana, 2016 through 2018.

Peter Silvester wrote: "His solos are notable for their coherence and logical progression, which propels them to a satisfying climax. Of all the contemporary pianists, Seeley reproduces the sound and spirit of Meade Lux Lewis with the most conviction and sometimes even surpasses the master" (p. 247-248).

Seeley lived with his mother until about age 55 and has one brother named James Seeley.

References
The Story of Boogie-Woogie - A Left Hand Like God, Silvester, Peter J., The Scarecrow Press, 2009, Maryland (USA), 2nd edition,

External links
 Seeley/Baldori music site

Living people
1928 births
American blues pianists
American male pianists
American jazz pianists
Boogie-woogie pianists
Musicians from Detroit
20th-century American pianists
Jazz musicians from Michigan
21st-century American pianists
20th-century American male musicians
21st-century American male musicians
American male jazz musicians